Byutyay-Yurdya (Bütey Ürde) is a rural locality (a selo), the only inhabited locality, and the administrative center of Betyunsky Rural Okrug of Namsky District in the Sakha Republic, Russia, located  from Namtsy, the administrative center of the district. Its population as of the 2010 Census was 608, up from 578 recorded during the 2002 Census.

References

Notes

Sources
Official website of the Sakha Republic. Registry of the Administrative-Territorial Divisions of the Sakha Republic. Namsky District. 

Rural localities in Namsky District
Populated places on the Lena River